Monique Keraudren-Aymonin (8 December 1928– 25 May 1981) was a French botanist.

She was researcher and taxonomist in the National Museum of Natural History of France, in Paris.

She specialised  in the study of the flora of Madagascar and of the Comoros, of the family of the Cucurbitaceae.

She married the French botanist Gérard Guy Aymonin.

Publications 
Keraudren-Aymonin, Monique (1978), Taxonomic aspects of African economic botany. Proc. IX plenary meeting of Association pour l'Etude Taxonomique de la Flore d'Afrique Tropicale, AETFAT, Las Palmas de Gran Canaria, 18–23 March 1978
 Keraudren-Aymonin, Monique (1970), Mitteilungen der Botanischen Staatssammlung München. 10 Proc. of the 7º plenary meeting of the Association pour l'Etude Taxonomique of the Flore of l'Afrique Tropicale, AETFAT, Munich, 7–12 September 1970

Honours 
Several plants were named after her:
 (Annonaceae) Polyalthia keraudreniae Le Thomas & G.E.Schatz
 (Asclepiadaceae) Stapelianthus keraudreniae Bosser & Morat
 (Begoniaceae) Begonia keraudreniae Bosser
 (Convolvulaceae) Ipomoea keraudreniae Deroin 
 (Fabaceae) Vigna keraudrenii Du Puy & Labat
 (Loranthaceae) Socratina keraudreniana Balle
Also, a genus of plant from central Asia;
 (Apiaceae) Keraymonia

Notes

External links 
 
 

Women botanists
Botanists with author abbreviations
French women scientists
1981 deaths
1928 births
20th-century French women writers